Pathamuttom is a village in the Kottayam district, in the Indian state of Kerala. Stephanos Mar Theodosius, the bishop of the Calcutta Diocese of the Malankara Orthodox Church, was born there.

Location 
Kottayam, Changanassery, Thiruvalla, and Alappuzha are the closest cities to Pathamuttom. It is also  from Kottayam Railway Station. Popular tourist centres like Kumarakom, Alleppey, Kuttanad and Mararikulam, are located near Pathamuttom.

Language
Malayalam and Hindi are the most widely used languages in Pathamuttom.

Education

Saintgits College of Engineering 
The Saintgits College of Engineering is in Pathamuttom. The college was founded in 2002 by a group of educators. Their primary focus for the institution was to expose young minds to the world of technology.

References

Villages in Kottayam district